Stena Vision is a cruise ferry owned and operated by Stena Line. As Stena Germanica, she operated the overnight Kiel–Gothenburg route and also during the summer months the route Gothenburg–Fredrikshavn. Since 2010, she has been on the Karlskrona–Gdynia route.

History

Stena Germanica was the first of four  large ferries ordered in 1980 by Stena Line for Scandinavian routes. She was launched in August 1981 as the Stena Scandinavica. However, due to problems at the construction yard, completion was delayed and it was not until 1987 that she entered service as the Stena Germanica on the overnight Kiel–Gothenburg route, joined in 1988 by the second of the quartet, Stena Scandinavica. In 2010, Stena Germanica was replaced by Stena Hollandica.  Following rebuilding in Gothenburg she was renamed Stena Vision.

Layout
In her original layout, Stena Germanica had berths for 2,374 passengers and took 550 cars. Following refit, Stena Vision accommodates 1,700 passengers in a variety of standards of cabin. Her vehicle deck can take 360 cars. She is a Ro Ro ferry.

Service
From 1987 to 2010, Stena Germanica operated the overnight Gothenburg–Kiel route.

From 1987 to 2000, Stena Germanica during the summer months operated the Gothenburg–Fredrikshavn route.

Since 2010, Stena Vision has operated on the Karlskrona–Gdynia route.

From 2023 she is scheduled to become the second ship on the Rosslare-Cherbourg route.

References

External links

Ferries of Sweden
Ferries of Poland
1981 ships
Vision